Kumasi Mutiny started on 18 March 1901 in Kumasi  as the native troops mutinied and fired on British troops. The event persisted for three weeks because the native troops had not been paid for months despite constant promises from the British Government.

History 
The Kumasi Mutiny was recorded in the British popular press at the time as the “Coomassie Mutiny”. The African colonial armies were responsible and guarded frontiers and acted as imperial troops in overseas campaign. Maintaining internal security was their primary role. The West African Regiment in Asante use their arms and collective muscle to defy and threaten the authorities which employed them in 1901. The native troops had not been paid for months despite constant promises from the British Government and some of the men were absent without leave from an evening parade. In total, 60 men were absent at first and 178 more men had disappeared the next morning. The native troops mutinied and fired on British troops who returned fire, killing 12 mutineers which lasted for 3 weeks.

They troops were tried under the Army Act of 1881, sentenced and imprisoned in Sierra Leone. A dozen were sentenced to be executed by firing squad, but the sentence was later commuted to penal servitude.

Private Luseini an NCO of the British West African Regiment. Luseini was one of 134 soldiers who were imprisoned in Sierra Leone after the Kumasi Mutiny.

References 

History of Ghana
1901 in Gold Coast (British colony)
Kumasi